is a Japanese manga artist, known for the manga series Demon Slayer: Kimetsu no Yaiba (2016–2020). As of February 2021, the manga had over 150 million copies in circulation (including digital copies), making it the ninth best-selling manga series of all time.

Gotouge was included as "Phenoms" in Times annual list of 100 Most Influential People, becoming the first manga artist to receive the achievement.

Early life
Gotouge was born in Fukuoka Prefecture, Japan, on May 5, 1989. The author uses a pen name to maintain anonymity.

Career
In 2013, Gotouge debuted in the 70th Jump Treasure Newcomer Manga Awards with the one-shot work .

After Haeniwa no Zigzag failed to be a serialized series, Tatsuhiko Katayama (Gotouge's first editor) suggested to start a series with an "easy-to-understand theme". Gotouge's debut work Kagarigari would serve as a basis for Demon Slayer: Kimetsu no Yaiba. The series was published in Weekly Shōnen Jump from February 15, 2016, to May 18, 2020. It became a success, with over 150 million copies in circulation (including digital copies) as of February 2021, making it one of the best-selling manga series of all time.

In February 2021, Gotouge commented that their next project would be a science fiction romantic comedy story.

Influences
Gotouge has mentioned Hirohiko Araki's JoJo's Bizarre Adventure; Masashi Kishimoto's Naruto; Tite Kubo's Bleach; and Hideaki Sorachi's Gintama as influences on their work.

Awards and honors
In 2020, Gotouge received the 2nd Kodansha's Noma Publishing Culture Award, which honors those who have contributed to "reinventing publishing". Gotouge received the award due to the franchise's sales, which boosted the entire publishing industry from 2019 to 2020. In the same year, Gotouge also won the award for best screenplay/original story at the Tokyo Anime Award Festival.

In February 2021, Gotouge was included as "Phenoms" in Times annual list of 100 Most Influential People, making them the first manga artist to receive the achievement. In March 2021, Gotouge won the Newcomer Award in the media fine arts category of the 2020 Minister of Education, Culture, Sports, Science and Technology Fine Arts Recommendation Awards. In 2021, Gotouge received the Special Prize of the 25th annual Tezuka Osamu Cultural Prize. In 2021, Gotouge won the Comic division's grand prize of the 50th Japan Cartoonists Association Awards.

Works
 (2013) — One-shot
 (2014)  — One-shot published in Shueisha's Jump Next!
 (2014)  — One-shot published in Shueisha's Weekly Shōnen Jump
 (2015)  — One-shot published in Shueisha's Weekly Shōnen Jump
 (2016–2020)  — Serialized in Shueisha's Weekly Shōnen Jump, collected in 23 tankōbon volumes
 (2019) — Collected volume of Gotouge's four one-shots published by Shueisha

References

External links

1989 births
Living people
Manga artists from Fukuoka Prefecture
Winner of Tezuka Osamu Cultural Prize (Special Award)
21st-century pseudonymous writers